The Mutatá Fault is a strike-slip fault in the department of Antioquia in northern Colombia. The fault is active and produced the 2016 Mutatá earthquake with a moment magnitude of 6.0.

Etymology 
The fault is named after Mutatá.

Description 
The Mutatá Fault is located in northwestern Colombia, between the Penderisco River and the Caribbean Sea. To the south, near the town of Mutatá, the Mutatá Fault approaches the Murrí Fault and the two fault zones practically merge. In this area, the Mutatá Fault places Cretaceous intrusive rocks and greenstones (to the east) in contact with sedimentary Tertiary rocks (to the west). Farther north, the fault cuts Tertiary and Quaternary deposits, with uplift of the eastern block. The Mutatá Fault is located near the junction of the Malpelo, Caribbean, and North Andean Plates. There is an elongate, tectonically depressed zone between the Mutatá and Murrí Faults. The Mutatá Fault has a prominent topographic expression near the town of Mutatá, as seen on SIR-A satellite images. To the north of Río Sucio, the Mutatá Fault shows discontinuous linear valleys, notches, and trenches (grabens). There are aligned hills and slope changes close to the Central Ranges. Fault scarps, sag ponds, and aligned valleys are very common tectonic features along most of the fault's trace.

Some authors consider the fault the northern part of the Murrí-Mutatá Fault.

Activity 
The most recent earthquake associated with the fault was the 2016 Mutatá earthquake (Mw 6.0).

See also 

 List of earthquakes in Colombia
 Murindó Fault
 Unguía Fault
 Romeral Fault System

References

Bibliography

Maps

Further reading 
 

Seismic faults of Colombia
Thrust faults
Active faults
Earthquakes in Colombia
Faults